Petar Ivanov (30 August 1894 – 1961) was a Croatian rower who competed for Italy in the 1924 Summer Olympics. In 1924, he won the bronze medal as crew member of the Italian boat in the men's eight competition. After his competitive career, he was the head rowing coach for VK Krka Šibenik. He died in 1961.

References

External links
Petar Ivanov's profile at databaseOlympics
Petar Ivanov's profile at the Italian Olympic Committee

1894 births
1961 deaths
Sportspeople from Zadar
Italian male rowers
Italian people of Croatian descent
Croatian male rowers
Olympic bronze medalists for Italy
Olympic rowers of Italy
Rowers at the 1924 Summer Olympics
Olympic medalists in rowing
Medalists at the 1924 Summer Olympics
European Rowing Championships medalists
Place of death missing